The Mayor's Nest is a 1932 British comedy film directed by Maclean Rogers and starring Sydney Howard, Claude Hulbert and Al Bowlly. It was made at Elstree Studios. A trombonist becomes mayor of a small town, but he struggles to cope with municipal issues.

Cast
 Sydney Howard as Joe Pilgrim
 Claude Hulbert as Algernon Ashcroft
 Al Bowlly as George
 Muriel Aked as Mrs. Ashcroft
 Frank Harvey as Councillor Blackett
 Michael Hogan as Tom Ackroyd
 Miles Malleson as Clerk
 Cyril Smith as Magistrate
 Syd Crossley as Milkman

References

Bibliography
 Low, Rachael. Filmmaking in 1930s Britain. George Allen & Unwin, 1985.
 Wood, Linda. British Films, 1927-1939. British Film Institute, 1986.

External links

1932 films
1932 comedy films
Films directed by Maclean Rogers
British comedy films
Films set in England
British black-and-white films
British and Dominions Studios films
Films shot at Imperial Studios, Elstree
1930s British films